Pseudapina lanceovalva is a species of moth of the family Tortricidae. It is found in Venezuela.

The length of the forewings is 5.8-6.1 mm for males and 7 mm for females. The ground colour of the forewings is white, sprinkled with brown and red-brown scales. Adults have been recorded on wing in July, August and October.

Etymology
The species name refers to the broadly lanceolate shape of the valva in the male genitalia.

References

Moths described in 2003
Euliini